The Polochic River is a  river in eastern Guatemala. It was used many years ago to transport coffee and timber, but most commercial transport in the river valley is now carried out by truck.

References

Polochic